For a useful starting point goto  Oregon Encyclopedia of History and Culture (2022). Not yet in print format; it is online here with 2000 articles.

The following published works deal with the cultural, political, economic, military, biographical and geologic history of pre-territorial Oregon, Oregon Territory and the State of Oregon.

Surveys of Oregon history
 
 
 
 
 
 
 
 
 
 
 
 
 
 
 Stack, William C. Historic Photos of Oregon (2010)

Pre-statehood

Historic expeditions

Lewis and Clark Expedition (1804-1806)

Geography and environment
 Bell, Jon. On Mount Hood: A Biography of Oregon's Perilous Peak (2011) 
 Dillow, Frank. "Connecting Oregon: The Slow Road to Rapid Communications, 1843-–2009." Oregon Historical Quarterly 111.2 (2010): 184–219. in JSTOR
 Hayes, Derek. Historical Atlas of Washington and Oregon (2011)

Business, industry and labor
 
 
 
 
 Brock, Emily K. Money Trees: The Douglas Fir and American Forestry, 1900-1944 (Oregon State University Press, 2015). 272 pp.

Military histories

Native American histories
 , on Indians

Local and regional histories
 Abbott, Carl. "From urban frontier to metropolitan region: Oregon's cities from 1870 to 2008." Oregon Historical Quarterly (2009): 74–95. online

Portland
 Abbott, Carl. Portland in Three Centuries (Oregon State University Press, 2011)
 Abbott, Carl. "Regional city and network city: Portland and Seattle in the twentieth century." Western Historical Quarterly (1992): 293–322. online
 Gibson, Karen, and Carl Abbott. "Portland, Oregon." Cities 19.6 (2002): 425–436.

Columbia river

Ghost towns

Biographies

Memoirs, diaries and journals

Political histories
 
 Burton, Robert E. "The New Deal in Oregon," in John Braeman et al. eds. The New Deal: Volume Two - the State and Local Levels (1975) pp 355–75
 
 Etulain, Richard W. (2013). Lincoln and Oregon Country Politics in the Civil War. Corvallis, OR: Oregon State University Press.

Culture

Social history

Geology

Journals

Bibliographies

See also
 American frontier
 Bibliography of Montana history
 Bibliography of Idaho history
 Bibliography of Wyoming history

Notes

History of Oregon
Bibliographies of the United States and territories
Bibliographies of history